Fife is a council area, historic county, registration county and lieutenancy area of Scotland. It is situated between the Firth of Tay and the Firth of Forth, with inland boundaries with Perth and Kinross (i.e. the historic counties of Perthshire and Kinross-shire) and Clackmannanshire. By custom it is widely held to have been one of the major Pictish kingdoms, known as Fib, and is still commonly known as the Kingdom of Fife within Scotland. A person from Fife is known as a Fifer. In older documents the county was very occasionally known by the anglicisation Fifeshire.

Fife is Scotland's third largest local authority area by population. It has a resident population of just under 367,000, over a third of whom live in the three principal settlements, Dunfermline, Kirkcaldy and Glenrothes.

The historic town of St Andrews is located on the northeast coast of Fife. It is well known for the University of St Andrews, the most ancient university of Scotland and one of the oldest universities in the world. From the 15th century it was the metropolis of the former Archdiocese of St Andrews, St Andrews Cathedral having been the seat of the most senior bishop of Scotland since the 10th century. St Andrews is also renowned as the home of golf.

History
Fife, bounded to the north by the Firth of Tay and to the south by the Firth of Forth, is a natural peninsula whose political boundaries have changed little over the ages. The Pictish king list and De Situ Albanie documents of the Poppleton manuscript mention the division of the Pictish realm or Albany into seven sub-kingdoms, one being Fife. The earliest known reference to the common epithet The Kingdom of Fife dates from only 1678, in a proposition that the term derives from the quasi-regal privileges of the Earl of Fife. The notion of a kingdom may derive from a misinterpretation of an extract from Wyntoun. The name is recorded as Fib in A.D. 1150 and Fif in 1165. It was often associated with Fothriff.

The hill-fort of Clatchard Craig, near Newburgh, was occupied as an important Pictish stronghold between the sixth and eighth centuries AD.

Fife was an important royal and political centre from the reign of King Malcolm III onwards, as the leaders of Scotland gradually moved southwards away from their ancient strongholds around Scone. Malcolm had his principal home in Dunfermline and his wife Margaret was the main benefactor of Dunfermline Abbey. The Abbey replaced Iona as the final resting place of Scotland's royal elite, with Robert I amongst those to be buried there.

The Earl of Fife was until the 15th century considered the principal peer of the Scottish realm, and reserved the right of crowning the nation's monarchs, reflecting the prestige of the area.

A new royal palace was gradually constructed at Falkland, formerly the stronghold of Clan MacDuff, and was used by successive monarchs of the House of Stuart, who favoured Fife for its rich hunting grounds.

King James VI of Scotland described Fife, in  the golden fringe being the coast and its chain of little ports with their thriving fishing fleets and rich trading links with the Low Countries. Wool, linen, coal and salt were all traded. Salt pans heated by local coal were historically a feature of the Fife coast. The distinctive red clay pan tiles seen on many old buildings in Fife arrived as ballast on trading boats and replaced the previously thatched roofs.

In 1598, King James VI employed a group of 11 men from Fife, who became known as the Fife adventurers, to colonise the Isle of Lewis in an attempt to begin the "civilisation" and de-gaelicisation of the region. This endeavour lasted until 1609 when the colonists, having been opposed by the native population, were bought out by Kenneth Mackenzie, the clan chief of the Mackenzies.

Fife became a centre of heavy industry in the 19th century. Coal had been mined in the area since at least the 12th century, but the number of pits increased ten-fold as demand for coal grew in the Victorian period. Previously rural villages such as Cowdenbeath rapidly swelled into towns as thousands moved to Fife to find work in its mines. The opening of the Forth and Tay rail bridges linked Fife with Dundee and Edinburgh and allowed the rapid transport of goods. Modern ports were constructed at Methil, Burntisland and Rosyth. Kirkcaldy became the world centre for the production of linoleum. Postwar Fife saw the development of Scotland's second new town, Glenrothes. Originally to provide housing for miners at a new coal mine, the town eventually attracted a high number of modern Silicon Glen companies to the region. Fife Council and Fife Constabulary also centre their operations in Glenrothes.

The Local Government (Scotland) Act 1889 established a uniform system of county councils in Scotland and realigned the boundaries of many of Scotland's counties. Subsequently, Fife County Council was created in 1890. Fife County Council was based at County Buildings in Catherine Street in Cupar. 

From 1975 to 1996 Fife was a local government region, divided into three districts: Dunfermline, Kirkcaldy and North-East Fife. In 1996 the district councils were abolished and Fife Regional Council became a unitary authority known as Fife Council. Fife is one of the six local authorities in the city region of Edinburgh and southeast Scotland. 

There was a parliamentary constituency of Fife in the House of Commons of the United Kingdom until 1885 and the Fife constituency in the Parliament of Scotland until the Acts of Union 1707.

There are numerous notable historical buildings in Fife, some of which are managed by the National Trust for Scotland or Historic Scotland. They include Dunfermline Abbey (the last resting place of Scottish royalty), the palace in Culross, Ravenscraig Castle in Kirkcaldy, Dysart Harbour area, Balgonie Castle near Coaltown of Balgonie, Falkland Palace (hunting palace of the Scottish Kings), Kellie Castle near Pittenweem, Hill of Tarvit (a historical house), St. Andrews Castle, St. Andrews Cathedral and St. Rule's Tower.

Governance

Fife is represented by five constituency members of the Scottish Parliament (MSPs) and four members of the United Kingdom parliament (MPs) who are sent to Holyrood and the British Parliament respectively. Following the 2015 general election, all four of the MPs constituencies were held by the Scottish National Party. In the 2017 general election, Kirkcaldy and Cowdenbeath was regained by Labour. At the same election, the seat of North East Fife became the closest seat in the country with the SNP holding a majority of 2 over the Liberal Democrats. Three of the Scottish Parliament constituencies are held by the Scottish National Party: Cowdenbeath, Dunfermline and Mid Fife and Glenrothes. One is held by the Scottish Liberal Democrats: North East Fife.

Fife Council's administrative  headquarters and Police Scotland's P Division (formerly Fife Constabulary) are based in Glenrothes. The Council meetings take place in Fife House (formerly known as Glenrothes House) in the town centre. The west wing of the building was built by the Glenrothes Development Corporation (GDC) as their offices in 1969, which was later used as the headquarters of Fife Regional Council. The former administrative seat was Cupar. Since the last Scottish election in 2012, Fife Council has been run as a minority by the Labour party, with a total of 35 seats, with support of Tory and independent councillors. Alex Rowley was elected leader of Fife Council but demitted office following his election as an MSP. David Ross succeeded as leader in February 2014. The SNP and the other parties form the opposition.

Geography

 

Fife is a peninsula in eastern Scotland bordered on the north by the Firth of Tay, on the east by the North Sea and by the Firth of Forth to the south. The route to the west is partially blocked by the mass of the Ochil Hills. Almost all road traffic into and out of Fife has to pass over one of four bridges, south on the Forth Road Bridge (public transport and cyclists only) and Queensferry Crossing, west on the Kincardine Bridge or north-east via the Tay Road Bridge, the exception being traffic headed north on the M90. Tolls were abolished on the Tay Road Bridge and Forth Road Bridge on 11 February 2008.

There are extinct volcanic features, such as the Lomond Hills which rise above rolling farmland, and Largo Law, a volcanic plug in the east. At , the West Lomond is the highest point in Fife. The coast has fine but small harbours, from the industrial docks in Burntisland and Rosyth to the fishing villages of the East Neuk such as Anstruther and Pittenweem. The large area of flat land to the north of the Lomond Hills, through which the River Eden flows, is known as the Howe of Fife.

North of the Lomond Hills can be found villages and small towns in a primarily agricultural landscape. The areas in the south and west of Fife, including the towns of Dunfermline, Glenrothes, Kirkcaldy and the Levenmouth region are lightly industrial and more densely populated. The only areas which could claim to be heavily industrial are Rosyth, around the naval dockyard and perhaps the Mossmorran Natural Gas Liquids fractionation plant on the outskirts of Cowdenbeath.

The east corner of Fife, along the string of villages between Earlsferry and Kingsbarns, and along with their hinterland, is known as the East Neuk (corner, or projecting point of land) of Fife; small settlements around sheltered harbours, with distinctive vernacular "Dutch" or corbie (crow) stepped gabled and stone-built architecture. The area has amongst the highest concentration of second homes and holiday lets in Scotland. The fishing industry, on which the coastal East Neuk settlements were built, has declined in recent years with the main fishing fleet now operating from Pittenweem and the harbour in Anstruther being used as a marina for pleasure craft.

There are several islands located off the coast of Fife, such as the Isle of May, Inchkeith and Inchcolm. The former Preston Island south of Valleyfield is no longer an island following land reclamation work.

Settlements

Cupar took over as county town from Crail in the early 13th century. Glenrothes is now the administrative centre, after the decision to locate the headquarters of the newly established Fife Regional Council there in 1975. Fife's three major towns are Kirkcaldy, Dunfermline (awarded city status in 2022) and Glenrothes. According to the 2012 estimate, Dunfermline is the largest settlement by population, followed by Kirkcaldy then Glenrothes. The next most sizeable towns by population are St Andrews, Cowdenbeath, Rosyth, Methil and Dalgety Bay.

Principal settlements

Historic parishes
The county was formerly divided into parishes, often but not always based on a town or village:

 Abbotshall
 Abdie
 Aberdour
 Anstruther Easter
 Anstruther Wester
 Arngask (to Perthshire in 1891)
 Auchterderran
 Auchtermuchty
 Auchtertool
 Ballingry
 Balmerino
 Beath
 Buckhaven
 Burntisland
 Cameron
 Carnbee
 Carnock
 Cellardyke
 Ceres
 Collessie
 Cowdenbeath
 Crail
 Creich
 Crossgates
 Culross (to Fife from Perthshire, 1891)
 Cults
 Cupar
 Dairsie
 Dalgety
 Dunbog
 Dunfermline
 Dunino
 Dysart
 Elie
 Falkland
 Ferry Port on Craig
 Flisk
 Forgan
 Freuchie
 Glenrothes
 Inverkeithing
 Kelty
 Kemback
 Kennoway
 Kilconquhar
 Kilmany
 Kilrenny
 Kinghorn
 Kinglassie
 Kingsbarns
 Kingskettle
 Kirkcaldy
 Ladybank
 Largo
 Leslie
 Leuchars
 Leven
 Lochgelly
 Logie
 Lumphinnans
 Markinch
 Methil
 Monimail
 Moonzie
 Newburgh
 Newburn
 Pitlessie
 Pittenweem
 Rosyth
 Saline
 Scoonie
 St Andrews & St Leonards
 St Monance (and Abercrombie)
 Strathmiglo
 Thornton
 Torryburn
 Wellwood
 Wemyss
 Wormit

Culture

Fife contains 4,961 listed buildings and 48 conservation areas. Domestic sites of importance include Falkland Palace, Kellie Castle, Dunfermline Palace, St Andrews Castle, Culross Palace and Kirkcaldy's Ravenscraig Castle. Fife also has a number of ecclesiastical sites of historical interest. St Andrews Cathedral was home to the powerful Archbishopric of St Andrews, and later became a centre of the Scottish Reformation, while Dunfermline Abbey was the last resting place of a number of Scottish kings. Balmerino and Culross abbeys were both founded in the 13th century by the Cistercians, while a century before Lindores Abbey was founded by the Tironensians outside Newburgh; all were highly important sites.

The Stanza Poetry Festival, East Neuk Festival, and Pittenweem Arts Festival are events of national cultural importance. Smaller festivals like the Cupar Arts Festival also take place. The Byre Theatre in St Andrews and Adam Smith Theatre in Kirkcaldy are both highly regarded as touring venues, the latter also being the base of the grand opera company Fife Opera.  The Byre has re-opened in Autumn, 2014 following its going into administration in 2012.

Places of interest

 Aberdour Castle
 Balbirnie Stone Circle
 Balfarg
 Balgonie Castle
 Balmerino Abbey
 Bunnet Stane
 Cambo Estate
 Caves of Caiplie
 Church of St Mary on the Rock
 Craigtoun Country Park
 Culross Abbey
 Deep Sea World
 Dunfermline Abbey
 Dunfermline Palace
 Falkland Palace
 Fife Coastal Path
 Fife Folk Museum
 Fife Heritage Railway
 Fife Pilgrim Way
 Forth Bridge
 Inchcolm Abbey
 Isle of May
 Kellie Castle
 Kingsbarns Distillery and Visitor Centre
 Kirkcaldy Galleries
 Lindores Abbey
 Lindores Abbey distillery
 Links Market
 Lochore Meadows
 Lomond Hills Regional Park
 Lundin Links standing stones
 MacDuff's Cross
 Museum of the University of St Andrews
 Newark Castle
 Norman's Law
 Ochil Hills
 Old Course at St Andrews
 Pittencrieff Park
 Ravenscraig Castle
 Reaper (sailing vessel)
 Riverside Park, Glenrothes
 Rosyth Castle
 Scotland's Secret Bunker
 Scottish Deer Centre
 Scottish Fisheries Museum
 Seafield Tower
 St Andrews Aquarium
 St Andrews Castle
 St Andrews Cathedral
 St Andrews Museum
 Swilcan Bridge
 Tay Rail Bridge
 Tentsmuir National Nature Reserve
 The R&A World Golf Museum

Notable Fifers
 Robert Adam, architect
 Stuart Adamson, musician (Big Country, The Skids)
 Robert Hope Moncrieff Aitken, Lieutenant in the 13th, Bengal Native Infantry, awarded the Victoria Cross
William Allan, classicist at the University of Oxford
 Ian Anderson, musician, frontman of Jethro Tull
 Iain Banks, writer
 Lady Anne Barnard, travel writer, artist and socialite of the period
 Andrew Whyte Barclay, physician, Lumleian lecturer, and Harveian orator
 Jim Baxter, footballer
 David Bethune, Archbishop of St Andrews
 George Bethune, MSP for Kilrenny
 James Bethune, Archbishop of St Andrews
 James Bethune, Archbishop of Glasgow
 Janet Bethune, noblewoman
 Mary Bethune, attendant of Mary, Queen of Scots
 Elizabeth Bethune, mistress of King James V of Scotland
 Guy Berryman, bassist from the band Coldplay
 Sir James Black, pharmacologist and nobel prize winner
 Sir Ernley Blackwell, lawyer and civil servant
 Edith Bowman, BBC Radio 1/6 DJ
 Caroline Brazier, librarian
 Gordon Brown, former British Prime Minister and Chancellor of the Exchequer and former MP for Kirkcaldy and Cowdenbeath
 Scott Brown, Scotland and Celtic F.C. footballer
 Gregory Burke, playwright
 Kenn Burke, ballet dancer
 Andrew Carnegie, industrialist and philanthropist
 Henry Chisholm, steel industry executive
 Jim Clark, two-times Formula One World Drivers' Champion
 James Clephan, Lieutenant on board HMS Spartiate during the Battle of Trafalgar
 Archibald Constable, publisher, bookseller and stationer
 Kenneth Cranham, actor
 King Creosote, musician
 Lawrence Daly, General Secretary of the NUM
 David Danskin, principal founding member of Arsenal FC
 James Dewar, judge
 Barbara Dickson, singer and actress
 Thomas Millie Dow, artist, a member of the Glasgow School
 Peter Dumbreck, racing driver and 1998 Macau Grand Prix winner
 Philip Charles Durham, sailor and captain of HMS Defiance at Trafalgar
 Marjorie Fleming, child writer and poet
 Sir Sandford Fleming, engineer, who proposed worldwide standard time zones, engineered on the Intercolonial Railway and the Canadian Pacific Railway
 Valentine Fleming, member of parliament and father of the author Ian Fleming
 John Forbes, named the city of Pittsburgh
 Chris Fusaro, rugby player
 Thomas Lomar Gray, engineer noted for his pioneering work in seismology
 Martin Grehan, footballer
 Samuel Greig, Russian admiral and "Father of the Russian Navy"
 Thomas Hardy, minister of religion, Moderator of the General Assembly of the Church of Scotland and Professor of Ecclesiastical History at Edinburgh University
 Alexander Henderson, theologian, and an important ecclesiastical statesman
 Shirley Henderson, actress

 Peter Horne, rugby player
 Bob Howie and Dave Howie, rugby players
 Ninian Imrie, army officer and geologist
 Danny Inglis, darts player
 Richard Jobson, filmmaker, television presenter, musician, The Skids
 Peter Johnstone, Celtic FC footballer
 Henrietta Keddie, novelist who wrote under the pseudonym Sarah Tytler
 Deborah Knox, Olympic gold medallist in curling
 Craig Levein, Scottish former professional footballer and manager
 Jackie Leven, singer-songwriter
 Wallace Lindsay, classical scholar, palaeographer, Professor of Humanity at St Andrews University
 Robert Lindsay of Pitscottie, 16th-century writer
 Anne Macaulay musicologist, archaeologist, author and lecturer
 Douglas Mackinnon, director
 Val McDermid, writer
 Ken McNaught, footballer, Aston Villa F.C. centre back, 1982 European Cup Winner
 Willie McNaught, footballer, Raith Rovers F.C. defender
 Old Tom Morris, greenskeeper St Andrews Links and 4 times champion of The Open Championship
 Tom Nairn, political theorist of nationalism
 Rab Noakes, singer, songwriter, record producer
 Aileen Paterson, author/illustrator
 John Philip, missionary in South Africa
 David Pitcairn, physician
 John Pitcairn, British Marine officer killed at the Battle of Bunker Hill
 William Pitcairn, physician
 Ian Rankin, writer
 Craig and Charlie Reid, singer-songwriters of The Proclaimers
 David Rollo, rugby player
 Craig Russell (British author), writer
 Dougray Scott, actor
 John Scrimgeour of Myres, Master of Work for royal buildings for James V and Mary, Queen of Scots
 Alexander Selkirk, seafarer and inspiration for Robinson Crusoe
 Jimmy Shand, accordion player
 Daniel Sloss, comedian
 Adam Smith, philosopher and economist
 Jordan Smith, actor
 Mary Fairfax Somerville, science writer and polymath
 Catherine Steele, plant biochemist
 David Steel, former Presiding Officer of the Scottish Parliament and leader of the Liberal party and MSP for Lothian and MP for Tweeddale, Ettrick and Lauderdale
 Ian Stewart, co-founder of the Rolling Stones
 Lawrence Storione, miner and anarchist organiser
 Sir John Struthers, first Regius Professor of Anatomy at the University of Aberdeen
 John McDouall Stuart, explorer of Australia's interior
 Michaela Tabb, first female snooker referee to appear at the Crucible
 William Tennant, scholar and poet
 John Thomson, Celtic F.C. and Scotland goalkeeper
 KT Tunstall, musician
 Jack Vettriano, artist
 William Montgomery Watt, historian, Emeritus Professor in Arabic and Islamic Studies at the University of Edinburgh
 Sir David Wilkie, painter
 Alexander Wilson,  surgeon, type-founder, astronomer, mathematician and meteorologist
 James Wilson, signer of US Declaration of Independence, appointed by George Washington to first Supreme Court
 Jocky Wilson, darts player
 James Yorkston, musician
 Douglas Young, poet, scholar, translator, and leader of the Scottish National Party

Sports
St Andrews in Fife is the home of golf, and the headquarters of The R&A, the governing body of the sport throughout the world, aside from the United States and Mexico. The Royal and Ancient Golf Club of St Andrews, from which it was devolved in 2004, is the world's oldest golf club.

Fife has four football clubs that play in the Scottish Professional Football League: Dunfermline Athletic, East Fife (based in Methil), Kelty Hearts, and Raith Rovers (based in Kirkcaldy); Cowdenbeath played at this level between 1905 and 2022 but are now members of the Lowland Football League. Fifteen clubs compete in the East of Scotland League while one plays in the SJFA East Region.

Fife Flyers (based in Kirkcaldy) are the UK's oldest ice hockey club and play in Britain's top flight, the Elite Ice Hockey League.

Fife is also home to eight rugby union clubs. Howe of Fife (based in Cupar), and Kirkcaldy play in Scottish Rugby's national leagues while Dunfermline, Rosyth Sharks, Glenrothes, Madras, Waid Academy (based in Anstruther) compete in the Caledonia regional leagues. University of St Andrews – the oldest rugby club in Fife – play in the British Universities & Colleges Sport (BUCS) system.

Kingdom Kangaroos are Fife's only Australian Rules Football team, with training held in Rosyth and Kirkcaldy.

Aberdour Shinty Club have two men's teams, two women's teams and multiple youth squads.

Fife also has two competitive basketball teams; Dunfermline Reign, who play out of St Columba's High School in Dunfermline and compete across a number of national SBC competitions, and Fife Steel, a Kirkcaldy-based team, operating a number of age groups, with a Senior men's and an under 19's team currently playing in Division 3 of the Lothian Men's Basketball League.

Fife is the location of several of the nation's motorsport venues: Knockhill Racing Circuit, Scotland's national motorsport venue and the only FIA-graded venue in the country; Cowdenbeath Racewall, a stock car oval racing venue; Lochgelly Raceway, a venue containing the Driftland drifting course and a 1/4 mile oval; and Crail Raceway, a venue located on a former military aerodrome containing a 1/4 mile drag strip and a karting circuit, operated by the East of Scotland Kart Club.

Media
Locally published newspapers include the Fife Free Press in Kirkcaldy; the Dunfermline Press in Dunfermline; the Glenrothes Gazette in Glenrothes, the East Fife Mail in Leven, the Fife Herald in Cupar / Howe of Fife and the St Andrews Citizen in St Andrews. DC Thomson publishes Fife and West Fife editions of the Dundee Courier & Advertiser, and the Counties Edition of the Evening Telegraph is sold in Fife.

The only Fife-based radio station is Kingdom FM. There is also a community radio station that broadcasts each evening and is run solely by youths, called Fife Youth Radio. Other local radio stations, Tay FM, Tay 2 and Edinburgh's Forth 1 and Forth 2, broadcast to the northern and southern parts of the region respectively.

See also
 Abbeys and priories in Scotland
 Castles in Scotland
 Duke of Fife
 Earl of Fife
 Fire and Rescue Authority (Scotland)
 Historic houses in Scotland
 Kingdom Housing Association
 List of places in Fife
 Museums in Scotland

References

External links
 
 Knowfife Dataset
 Fife Council

 
Council areas of Scotland
Counties of Scotland
Pictish territories
Counties of the United Kingdom (1801–1922)
Lieutenancy areas of Scotland
Peninsulas of Scotland
Regions of Scotland